Hirasea is a genus of small, pulmonate land snails in the family Charopidae. This genus sees its highest diversity in the Hawaiian Islands, but species are distributed throughout Japan and Polynesia.

Species
The following species are recognised in the genus Hirasea:
 Hirasea acuta
 Hirasea acutissima
 Hirasea biconcava
 Hirasea chichijimana
 Hirasea diplomphalus
 Hirasea eutheca
 Hirasea goniobasis
 Hirasea hypolia
 Hirasea insignis
 Hirasea major
 Hirasea nesiotica
 Hirasea planulata
 Hirasea profundispira
 Hirasea sinuosa

References

External links

Endodontidae
Taxonomy articles created by Polbot